José Pascual Antonio Aguilar Márquez Barraza (17 May 191919 June 2007) was a Mexican singer, actor, songwriter, equestrian, film producer, and screenwriter with a dominating career in music. He recorded over 150 albums, which sold 25 million copies, and acted in more than 120 films. He was given the honorific nickname "El Charro de México" (Mexico's Horseman) because he is credited with popularizing the Mexican equestrian sport la charrería to international audiences.

Aguilar began his career singing on the Mexican radio station XEW in 1950. That year, he signed a contract with the Mexican independent label Musart Records and became one of its best-selling artists. He made his acting debut with Pedro Infante in the drama Un rincón cerca del cielo (1952). After appearing in gentleman roles in several films, he achieved popularity as a film star with his performance as lawman Mauricio Rosales in a series of seven films in the mid-1950s. His success increased with his tours throughout Latin America and his studio albums, which included Mexican folk songs (rancheras) and ballads (corridos). In the 1960s, he focused on producing and starring in films set in the Mexican Revolution. In 1970, he won Latin ACE Award for Best Actor for his portrayal of Emiliano Zapata in the 1970 epic film of the same name. He also portrayed Pancho Villa twice in film. In 1997, Aguilar was awarded the Golden Ariel for his "invaluable contribution and spreading of Mexican cinema". To this day, he has been the only Hispanic artist to sell out the Madison Square Garden of New York City for six consecutive nights in 1997.

His second wife was famous singer and actress Flor Silvestre. They had two sons, Antonio Aguilar Hijo and Pepe Aguilar, who also became singers and actors. His family is known as "La Dinastía Aguilar" (The Aguilar Dynasty).

Early life
Aguilar was born in Villanueva, Zacatecas, the son of Jesús Aguilar Aguilar and Ángela Márquez Barraza Valle, both of Villanueva. His parents had six other children: José Roque, Salvador (deceased), Guadalupe (deceased), Luis Tomás (deceased), Mariano (deceased) and Josefina. His cousin is Jose Rodriguez of Maravillas Villanueva Zac. He spent his early childhood in La Casa Grande de Tayahua, an hacienda first built in 1596 in the town of Tayahua, about 35 km from Villanueva. Aguilar's ancestors acquired this property in the early 19th century.

Career

Aguilar began his recording career in 1950, eventually making over 150 albums and selling more than 25 million records. He was known for his corridos, with some of his best known songs including "Gabino Barrera", "Caballo prieto azabache", "Albur de amor", and "Un puño de tierra". He was the first Mexican performer to mix rodeos and concerts while touring his show in Latin America and the United States. He has been compared to American actors like Roy Rogers, Gene Autry, and Ronald Reagan.

He began his acting career in 1952 during the Golden Age of Mexican cinema. In the 1950s, Aguilar was cast in a series of films centered on rural hero "Mauricio Rosales" in El rayo justiciero (1955), La barranca de muerte (1955), La sierra del terror (1956), La huella del chacal (1956), La pantera negra (1957), La guarida del buitre (1958), and Los muertos no hablan (1958). A total of seven low-budget ranchera films produced by Rosas Films S.A. Aguilar gained cinematic notice when cast in Ismael Rodríguez's Tierra de hombres in 1956. Other collaborations with Rodríguez include La Cucaracha (1959) and Ánimas Trujano (1962), where he received starring roles. Amongst his best ranchera films are Yo... el aventurero (1959), Caballo prieto azabache (1968), El ojo de vidrio (1969), and Valente Quintero (1973). Aguilar appeared in American western films like 1969's The Undefeated starring John Wayne. He also made a memorable starring role alongside his wife Flor Silvestre in Triste recuerdo (1991).

Aguilar was also largely responsible for the renewed popularity of the tambora music in the mid-1980s, when he single-handedly resuscitated the genre with the hit "Triste recuerdo".

Family

Aguilar was married to dancer Otilia Larrañaga and after their divorce he  married singer and actress Flor Silvestre (whose real name was Guillermina Jiménez Chabolla). One of their children, José "Pepe" Aguilar, is among Mexico's most popular modern singers. In addition to Pepe Aguilar, he had another child with Flor Silvestre who is the eldest, Antonio Aguilar, Jr. Aguilar's grandchildren include Emiliano, Aneliz, Leonardo, Ángela, María José and Flor Susana: Emiliano, Aneliz, Leonardo, and Ángela are Pepe Aguilar's children; María José and Flor Susana are Antonio Aguilar Jr.'s. children.

Death
On 18 June 2007, doctors announced that Aguilar was no longer responding to treatment and was expected to pass away before the end of the night. On 19 June 2007, the doctor spoke out to the media that Aguilar was still alive, and his body was responding to the medication, but was still in critical condition. While there, the family received visits from many famous people including Vicente Fernández.

Aguilar died on 19 June 2007 at 11:45 p.m. from pneumonia. His coffin was carried through the streets of Zacatecas, the state capital, and was honored at a memorial service attended by hundreds at a church there.

Obituaries appeared in many newspapers, including Los Angeles Times (US), The New York Times (US), The Washington Post (US), The Guardian (UK) and The Independent (UK). News of Antonio's death were reported in newspapers of many Spanish-speaking countries, including Guatemala (El Periódico), Honduras (La Tribuna), El Salvador (El Diario de Hoy), Nicaragua (El Nuevo Diario), Costa Rica (Diario Extra), Venezuela (Correo del Caroní), Peru (Crónica Viva), Colombia (El Tiempo), Ecuador (El Diario) and Chile (El Mercurio).

Awards and honors

In 2000, for his contributions to the recording industry, Aguilar was honored with a star on the Hollywood Walk of Fame at 7056 Hollywood Boulevard. In the same year, he was the recipient of the Excellence Award at the 2000 Lo Nuestro Awards and the ASCAP Latin Heritage Award.  In 2004, he was the presented with the Latin Grammy Lifetime Achievement Award. He was similarly honored with his handprints and star on the Paseo de las Luminarias in Mexico City for his work in movies and in the recording industry.

Discography

Studio albums
Éxitos de Antonio Aguilar
A Grito Abierto
El Aguijón
Corridos: Gabino Barrera y 11 Éxitos Más
Corridos con Antonio Aguilar
Cantos de Mi Tierra
Viva el Norte con Antonio Aguilar
La Voz del Pueblo
Ya Viene Amaneciendo
Puras Buenas
Puras Buenas Vol. II
La Mula Chula/Arriba Tayahua
15 Éxitos 15 con Tambora
15 Éxitos 15 Corridos Famosos

EPs
 Toma esta carta (1960s)
 Antonio Aguilar Nº9 (1960)
 Cancionero Toni Aguilar en Discos "Odeón" (1959)
 Antonio Aguilar Nº4, Nº5, Nº6, Nº7, Nº8 (1958)

Track listings

See also
 Antonio Aguilar filmography

References

External links
 
 Antonio Aguilar's movies at TKcine
 Pepe Aguilar's website - Antonio Aguilar's son
 Obituary in the Houston Chronicle
 Val de la O interviews Antonio Aguilar

1919 births
2007 deaths
20th-century Mexican male actors
Golden Ariel Award winners
People from Villanueva, Zacatecas
Deaths from pneumonia in Mexico
Golden Age of Mexican cinema
Mexican expatriates in Puerto Rico
Mexican male equestrians
Latin Grammy Lifetime Achievement Award winners
Latin music songwriters
20th-century Mexican male singers
Male actors from Zacatecas
Singers from Zacatecas